Tivantinib (ARQ197; by Arqule, Inc.) is an experimental small molecule anti-cancer drug. It is a bisindolylmaleimide that binds to the dephosphorylated MET kinase in vitro. (MET is a growth factor receptor.) Tivantinib is being tested clinically as a highly selective MET inhibitor. However, the mechanism of action of tivantinib is still unclear.

Tivantinib displays cytotoxic activity via molecular mechanisms that are independent from its ability to bind MET, notably tubulin binding, which likely underlies tivantinib cytotoxicity.

Possible applications include non-small-cell lung carcinoma, hepatocellular carcinoma, and oesophageal cancer.

In 2017, it was announced that a phase III clinical trial for advanced hepatocellular carcinoma had failed to meet the primary endpoint.

See also 
 Template:Intracellular chemotherapeutic agents   
 Template:Growth factor receptor modulators

References 

Bisindolylmaleimides
Experimental cancer drugs
Protein kinase inhibitors
Succinimides